Sadia Andalib Nabila is a Bangladeshi Australian actress and model widely known as Sadia Nabila. She is known for her Bollywood debut in Pareshaan Parinda and Bangladeshi film Mission Extreme alongside Arifin Shuvoo. Mission Extreme is the sequel to one of Bangladesh's highest-grossing films Dhaka Attack (2017). She was nominated for the Best New Actress category of the Meril-Prothom Alo Awards in 2021, for her Bangladeshi debut.

Biography 
Sadia Nabila was born in Bangladesh. She was raised in Saidpur Cantonment, Bangladesh, as her father was in the military. She completed her higher studies at the University of Canberra in Australia after completing her schooling in Saidpur, Bangladesh.

Filmography

References

External links
 Sadia Nabila at IMDB

Living people
Year of birth missing (living people)
Australian female models
Bangladeshi female models
21st-century Australian actresses
21st-century Bangladeshi actresses
Immigrants to Bangladesh
University of Canberra alumni